The 1932 Oklahoma Sooners football team represented the University of Oklahoma in the 1932 college football season. In their first year under head coach Lewie Hardage, the Sooners compiled a 4–4–1 record (3–2 against conference opponents), finished in a tie for second place in the Big Six Conference, and outscored their opponents by a combined total of 90 to 81.

No Sooners received All-America honors in 1932, but two Sooners received all-conference honors: guard Ellis Bashara and back Bob Dunlap.

Schedule

References

Oklahoma
Oklahoma Sooners football seasons
Oklahoma Sooners football